The blue-winged racket-tail or Sulu racquet-tail (Prioniturus verticalis) is a species of parrot in the family Psittaculidae.
It is endemic to Tawi-Tawi island in the Philippines and is one of the most endangered parrots in the world. It is threatened by habitat loss and the poaching for the cage-bird trade.

Description 
It has mainly dark green plumage on back, an olive/green on its breast and belly. Male birds have a pale blue with small red patch on its forehead and forecrown. Females look identical to the male except, they do not have a red spot on their forecrown. The primary feathers blue on outer webs while the middle tail feathers green. Racquet feathers black tinged with blue. Their side tail feathers are green tipped black. Their bill has a blue-grey hue.

It has been described as a rather tame bird and does not usually fear human presence (which has also led to its critically endangered status). They are usually seen in pairs flying over and in the high canopy of trees. It is also rather noisy in flight. This bird feeds on the fruit and flowers of fruiting trees.

Habitat and Conservation Status 
Its natural habitats are tropical moist lowland forests and subtropical or tropical mangrove forests.
It is now assessed as Critically Endangered by the IUCN Red List with population estimates being just 50 - 249 mature individuals. Its main threat is habitat loss and trapping. Once prevalent throughout all the islands of the Sulu Archipelago, the blue-winged racket-tail is now only found on isolated places on Tawi-Tawi due to rapid habitat destruction during the past 200 years.

One of this bird's threats is its own tame behavior. This tame behavior is taken advantage of by trappers and has made it an easy target to capture for the illegal exotic pet trade. Deforestation of the blue-winged racket-tail's natural habitat to make way for both legal and illegal logging agriculture, mining, and the uncontrolled settlement by humans has destroyed most of this bird's original habitat.

References

External links
BirdLife Species Factsheet.
Oriental Bird Images: Blue-winged Racquet-tail

blue-winged racket-tail
Endemic birds of the Philippines
Fauna of Tawi-Tawi
blue-winged racket-tail
Taxonomy articles created by Polbot